Shama, or Shama-Sambuga after its two dialects, is a Kainji language of Nigeria.

Sambuga is presumably extinct. It was spoken in Sambuga town, 10 km northwest of Kagara, in Rafi LGA, Niger State.

References

Kamuku languages
Languages of Nigeria